Yves Mangione (born 27 December 1964) is a French former professional footballer who played as a forward.

References

1964 births
Living people
Association football forwards
French footballers
Stade Rennais F.C. players
FC Annecy players
SC Toulon players
Olympique Alès players
SC Bastia players
Valenciennes FC players
OGC Nice players
Olympique de Valence players
Ligue 1 players
Ligue 2 players
INF Vichy players
Sportspeople from Toulon
Sportspeople from Provence-Alpes-Côte d'Azur